Acushnet may refer to some locations in the United States:

Acushnet, Massachusetts, a town
Acushnet Center, Massachusetts, in the town of Acushnet
Acushnet Company, golf equipment manufacturer
Acushnet Heights Historic District, New Bedford, Massachusetts
The Acushnet River of southeastern Massachusetts

Also, the first whaling ship on which Herman Melville served was the Acushnet.